The Volkswagen Passat (B8) is a mid-size car/large family car manufactured by Volkswagen that is available in a 4-door saloon and a 5-door estate body style sold as "Variant" in some markets. It was first introduced at the Volkswagen Design Center Potsdam on 3 July 2014. The B8 is the eighth-generation model in the Volkswagen Passat series and the first passenger vehicle of Volkswagen Group to be based on a stretched version of the MQB platform. The Passat Variant shares its platform with the Tiguan.

A facelift model was announced in 2019, with minor exterior changes, updated engine line-up (the BiTDI engine was dropped), and updated interior, with touch controls for the multimedia and steering controls.

The B8 is assembled in the Emden and Zwickau Volkswagen production plants in Germany. Sales of European domestic market models began in November 2014.

The GTE, a plug-in hybrid version, was introduced at the 2014 Paris Motor Show for sale during the second half of 2015 in Europe.

Design

Development
Being based on the MQB platform, the B8 Passat has more interior space than the last generation model despite being shorter and  lower. The front wheels were moved forward and the wheelbase extended by  resulting in a shorter front overhang and a bigger cabin. The B8 Passat weighs  less than the previous version by using vacuum-formed steel. It is offered with turbocharger-equipped engines ranging from 1.4 to 2.0 liters.

Driving assists
The B8 Passat is available with optional assistance systems including "Front Assist", "Pedestrian Detection", "Emergency Assist", "Traffic Jam Assist" and "Trailer Assist."

Front Assist
The system uses a long-range radar at the front of the car to detect vehicles up to 80m ahead which the car is likely to hit unless action is taken. The information from the front radar is relayed to the driver. Up to 30km/h the system can detect moving and stationary objects and apply full braking power. In moving traffic, between 30km/h and 200km/h, the system applies its full capacity of driver warnings, partial braking and brake assistance.

Emergency Assist 
This assistant tries to detect a sleeping/unconscious driver. It will attempt to reactivate the driver after steering feedback has not been detected for a period of time and will also transmit warning signals to its nearby surroundings. If the reactivation has failed, the vehicle will be stopped at a safe location.

Traffic Jam Assist 
The traffic jam assistance is capable of moving the vehicle in a traffic jam as long as the average speed does not exceed .

Trailer Assist 
The system allows automatic parking with an attached tow trailer.

Safety

Powertrains
The B8 Passat was initially available with two TSI petrol and four TDI diesel powertrains that produce more power than their equivalents from the B7 without changing displacement. The 2.0 TDI engine is available in three configurations, with two being equipped with selective catalytic reduction (SCR) catalysators to reduce the emission of nitrogen oxide.

Every engine with the exception of the SCR-equipped 2.0 TDI engines is mated to a six-speed transmission with an optional six-speed or seven-speed dual-clutch transmission. A 4Motion all-wheel drive drivetrain is available as standard for the strongest SCR TDI and TSI engines and optional for the mid-tier SCR TDI variant.

Every engine is based on 4Motion/BlueMotion Technology and is turbocharged inline-four. In 2015, four additional petrol and two diesel engines became available. In 2015, Passat received two more powerful petrol engines, marketing it as Passat R-Line, which was however shortly thereafter discontinued.

Passat GTE

The plug-in hybrid powertrain of the Passat GTE, previously utilised by the Volkswagen Golf GTE and Audi A3 Sportback e-tron, is featured with a larger battery pack in this model. When paired with the 1.4 liter ACT-equipped TSI petrol engine, it will deliver a fuel economy of 2.0 L/100 km (140 mpg‑imp; 120 mpg‑US) equivalent on the New European Driving Cycle, corresponding to CO2 emissions lower than 45g/km. The trunk size is reduced from 650 liters to 483 liters in the "Variant" stationwagon, compared to non-hybrid Passats, a reduction of 167 liters, due to the battery pack.

In 2018, a facelift was introduced, and the battery pack size increased from 9,9 kWh to 13 kWh. The range has increased to 55 km (34 mi, WLTP) or about 70 km (44 mi, NEDC), compared to the pre-facelift Passat GTE's range of 50 km (31 mi, NEDC). The rear end now has P A S S A T written over the tailgate with large letters, and the interior analog clock has been replaced with a black plastic piece with the hazard lights switch and P A S S A T written on it. The "Battery Charge" function in the infotainment system, which charges the battery using the petrol engine, has been removed.

Sales 
UK sales began in mid-2015, with deliveries in October 2015. In the Netherlands, pre-orders were opened in early 2015 with deliveries in September 2015.

Passat Alltrack
The Passat Alltrack was introduced in late 2015 for European markets and in early 2016 for Australian and New Zealand markets. There are more smaller changes, for example matte chrome wing mirrors, underbody protection, and Alltrack badging in the front, side, and rear. There are also interior changes, mainly adding Alltrack branding. Exclusive to the Alltrack is an off-road mode in the driving mode selector.

Powertrains consist of one TSI and three TDI engines, carried over from the regular Passat. Only the 150 PS TDI engine is offered with a manual 6-speed gearbox, while all other models come with VW's dual-clutch DSG gearbox. The 4MOTION system used in the Alltrack is a normally front-biased Haldex system.

Saloon discontinuation 
In January 2022, Volkswagen discontinued the 4-door saloon version of the Passat in Europe. Jacob Oliva alleges that, the estate version sells better in Europe, and that Volkswagen's Arteon liftback is positioned in a similar market segment.

References

Passat B8
2010s cars
Sedans
Cars introduced in 2014
Front-wheel-drive vehicles
All-wheel-drive vehicles
Mid-size cars
Plug-in hybrid vehicles
Station wagons
Euro NCAP large family cars